The Internet of Elsewhere: The Emergent Effects of a Wired World is a 2011 book by Cyrus Farivar, published by Rutgers University Press. The book explores the history and effects of the Internet in South Korea, Senegal, Estonia and Iran.

Farivar says he chose the four nations profiled because "they each represent vastly different experiences when it comes to the Internet". The Atlantic chose the book for its 2011 list of "10 Essential Books for Thought-Provoking Summer Reading".

References

2011 non-fiction books
Rutgers University Press books
Books about the Internet